Henry Kirby Taylor (August 10, 1858 – January 21, 1934) was president of Kentucky Wesleyan College, Northwest Missouri State University and the University of Texas at Arlington.

Early life
Taylor was born in Vanceburg, Kentucky.

Kentucky Wesleyan
Taylor earned a master's degree from Kentucky Wesleyan and was the school's president from 1906 to 1909.

Northwest Missouri
Taylor was president of Northwest from 1909 to 1913.

After Taylor arrived at Northwest, his predecessor Homer Martien Cook continued living in the President's house for four months, so the school had two de facto presidents during this period.

Taylor addressed numerous fiscal problems at the young university including paying back salaries to faculty (even though he went without himself).  He also settled the squabbles that had halted construction on the Administration Building which opened in December 1910 during his watch.

Other highlights included:
The first school newspaper issue in February 1910 (then called the Normal Index).
A dispute with Maryville, Missouri resulted in the town cutting off municipal water
The opening of a drive through the campus connecting Fourth Street and Seventh Street.

Texas Arlington
Taylor was president of the Arlington Training School from 1913 to 1916 which became the Arlington Military Academy.  Prior to his arrival it was the Carlisle Military Academy and he was attracted to the school because his son-in-law Josiah Jernigan Godbey as head master.
 
Taylor left the school to join the faculty at Texas Women's University and later Southern Methodist University. He died in Arlington on January 21, 1934 and is buried in Shannon Rose Hill Memorial Park Fort Worth, Texas.

References

People from Vanceburg, Kentucky
Kentucky Wesleyan College alumni
Presidents of Northwest Missouri State University
Presidents of the University of Texas at Arlington
Texas Woman's University faculty
Southern Methodist University faculty
1934 deaths
1858 births